Arthur Hamilton Livermore (August 14, 1915 – October 12, 2009) was a science educator.  He was educated at Reed College in Portland and in the University of Rochester in New York, where he worked on the synthesis of penicillin under Vincent du Vigneaud, who won the 1955 Nobel Prize in chemistry. He obtained a PhD in Chemistry in 1944. He taught biochemistry at Cornell University and Reed College to 1963. He was awarded a Guggenheim Fellowship in 1954 for work in Molecular & Cellular Biology.

He worked for the American Association for the Advancement of Science (AAAS) in Washington, D.C. from 1963 to 1981. For 18 months, he worked in Penang, Malaysia, training educators from Asian countries. In the 1970s, he directed a program for a university science lecturers' exchange between the U.S. and the Soviet Union. He was a member of the Cosmos Club.

After retirement, he continued as a science adviser, teacher and volunteer in Washington.

References

 Arthur H. Livermore Washington Post obituary
 How To Form and Operate a Local Alliance. A Handbook for Local Action To Improve Science and Technology Education
 Research and Development Toward the Improvement of Education
 A Process Approach to Elementary School Science
 Supply and Demand for High School Science Teachers in 1985
 Science Education at AAAS
 Science in the Primary Grades

1915 births
Reed College alumni
2009 deaths
People from Monroe, Washington
University of Rochester alumni
Cornell University faculty
Reed College faculty